Karate at the 2015 African Games in Brazzaville was held between September 4–6, 2015.

Results

Women's Kata

Women's Kumite -50 KG

Women's Kumite -55 KG

Women's Kumite -61 KG

Women's Kumite -68 KG

Women's Kumite +68 KG

Women's Team Kata

Women's Team Kumite

Men's Kata

Men's Kumite -60 KG

Men's Kumite -67 KG

Men's Kumite -75 KG

Men's Kumite -84 KG

Men's Kumite +84 KG

Men's Team Kata

Men's Team Kumite

Medal table
As of September 08, 2015

References

2015 African Games
African Games
2015